Rapes during the occupation of Japan were war rapes or rapes committed under the Allied military occupation of Japan. Allied troops committed a number of rapes during the Battle of Okinawa during the last months of the Pacific War and the subsequent occupation of Japan. The Allies occupied Japan until 1952 following the end of World War II and Okinawa Prefecture remained under US governance for two decades after. Estimates of the incidence of sexual violence by Allied occupation personnel differ considerably.

Background
By 1945 U.S. troops were entering and occupying territory with a Japanese civilian population. On February 19, 1945, U.S. troops landed on Iwo Jima, and on April 1, 1945, on Okinawa. In August 1945, Japan surrendered and Allied occupation troops landed on the main islands, starting the formal occupation of Japan. The Allied occupation ended in most of Japan on April 28, 1952, but did not end in Okinawa until May 15, 1972, when the terms of the Treaty of San Francisco went into effect.

During the Pacific War the Japanese Government frequently issued propaganda claiming that if the country was defeated Japanese women would be raped and murdered by Allied soldiers. The government used this claim to justify orders to soldiers and civilians in areas which were invaded by Allied forces to fight to the death or commit suicide.

Battle of Okinawa

According to Calvin Sims of The New York Times: "Much has been written and debated about atrocities that Okinawans suffered at the hands of both the Americans and Japanese in one of the deadliest battles of the war. More than 200,000 soldiers and civilians, including one-third of the population of Okinawa, were killed".

U.S. military rapes
There is no documentary evidence that mass rape was committed by Allied troops during the Pacific War. There are, however, numerous credible testimony accounts which allege that a large number of rapes were committed by U.S. forces during the Battle of Okinawa in 1945.

Okinawan historian Oshiro Masayasu (former director of the Okinawa Prefectural Historical Archives) writes:

According to Toshiyuki Tanaka, 76 cases of rape or rape-murder were reported during the first five years of the American occupation of Okinawa. However, he asserts this is probably not the true figure, as most cases were unreported.

Peter Schrijvers finds it remarkable that looking Asian was enough to be in danger of rape by American soldiers, as for example happened to some of the Korean comfort women that the Japanese had by force brought to the island. Schrijvers writes that "many women" were brutally violated with "not even the least mercy".

Although Japanese reports of rape were largely ignored at the time due to lack of records, as many as 10,000 Okinawan women may have been raped according to an estimate from one Okinawan historian. It has been claimed that the rape was so prevalent that most Okinawans over age 65 around the year 2000 either knew or had heard of a woman who was raped in the aftermath of the war. Military officials denied the mass rapes, and all surviving veterans refused The New York Times request for an interview.

Professor of East Asian Studies and expert on Okinawa Steve Rabson said: "I have read many accounts of such rapes in Okinawan newspapers and books, but few people know about them or are willing to talk about them". Books, diaries, articles and other documents refer to rapes by American soldiers of various races and backgrounds. Masaie Ishihara, a sociology professor, supports this: "There is a lot of historical amnesia out there, many people don't want to acknowledge what really happened".

An explanation given for why the US military has no record of any rapes is that few – if any – Okinawan women reported abuse, mostly out of fear and embarrassment. Those who did report them are believed by historians to have been ignored by the U.S. military police. A large scale effort to determine the extent of such crimes has also never been called for. Over five decades after the war has ended the women who were believed to have been raped still refused to give a public statement, with friends, local historians and university professors who had spoken with the women instead saying they preferred not to discuss it publicly. According to a Nago, Okinawan police spokesman: "Victimized women feel too ashamed to make it public".

In his book Tennozan: The Battle of Okinawa and the Atomic Bomb, George Feifer noted that by 1946 there had been fewer than 10 reported cases of rape in Okinawa. He explains that it was: "partly because of shame and disgrace, partly because Americans were victors and occupiers". Feifer claimed: "In all there were probably thousands of incidents, but the victims' silence kept rape another dirty secret of the campaign". Many people wondered why it never came to light after the inevitable American-Okinawan babies the many women must have had. In interviews, historians and Okinawan elders said that some Okinawan women who were raped did give birth to biracial children, but that many of them were immediately killed or left behind out of shame, disgust or fearful trauma. More often, however, rape victims underwent crude abortions with the help of village midwives.

According to George Feifer the majority of the likely thousands of rapes were committed in the north, where the campaign was easier and the American troops were not as exhausted as in the south. According to Feifer it was mostly troops landed for occupation duty who committed rapes.

Katsuyama killing incident

According to interviews carried out by The New York Times and published by them in 2000, multiple elderly people from an Okinawan village confessed that after the United States had won the Battle of Okinawa three armed African American Marines kept coming to the village every week to force the villagers to gather all the local women, who were then carried off into the hills and raped. The article goes deeper into the matter and claims that the villagers' tale – true or not – is part of a "dark, long-kept secret" the unraveling of which "refocused attention on what historians say is one of the most widely ignored crimes of the war": "the widespread rape of Okinawan women by American servicemen".

When the Marines started to confidently carry out their weekly ritual unarmed, the villagers reportedly overwhelmed the men and killed them. Their bodies were hidden in the nearby cave out of fear for retaliation against the village, a village secret until 1997. Since the killings, the cave has been known as Kurombo Gama, which is translated either as "Cave of The Negros" or, less commonly, "Niggers' Cave".

Silence about rape
Almost all rape victims were silent about what had happened to them, which helped to keep the rapes a "dirty secret" of the Okinawa campaign. The main reasons for the women's silence and the low number of reported rapes was, according to George Feifer, the American role as victor and occupiers, and feelings of shame and disgrace. According to Feifer, while there were probably thousands of rapes, fewer than 10 rapes were formally reported by 1946 and almost all of those were connected to "severe bodily harm".

Several factors contributed to few telltale American rape-induced pregnancies coming to term; many women had become temporarily infertile due to the stress  and malnutrition, and some who did become pregnant managed to abort before their husbands returned.

Japanese Army rapes
According to Thomas Huber from the United States Army Combined Arms Center, Japanese soldiers also mistreated Okinawan civilians during the battle there. Huber writes that rape was "freely committed" by Japanese soldiers who knew that they had little chance of surviving due to the Army's prohibitions against surrender. These abuses contributed to a post-war divide between Okinawans and mainland Japanese.

Official American policy and Japanese civilian expectations
Having historically been a separate nation until 1879, Okinawan language and culture differ in many ways from that of mainland Japan, where they often were discriminated against and treated in the same manner as Chinese and Koreans.

In 1944 heavy American air-bombings of Naha had left 1,000 dead and 50,000 homeless and sheltering in caves, and US naval bombardments contributed additionally to the death toll. During the Battle of Okinawa between 40,000 and 150,000 residents died. The survivors were put in internment camps by Americans.

During the fighting some Japanese troops mistreated Okinawan civilians, for example taking over the caves they sheltered in and forcing them out into the open, as well as killing some directly who they suspected of being American spies. During the last months of desperate fighting they were also unable to supply the Okinawan population with food and medicine.

Japanese propaganda about American atrocities had led many Okinawan civilians to believe that when the Americans came they would first rape all the women and then kill them. At least 700 civilians committed suicide. American soldiers did sometimes deliberately kill Okinawan civilians, though American official policy was to try not to kill them. The Americans also provided food and medicine, something the Japanese had been unable to do. In view of the propaganda claiming that American policy would be rape, torture and murder, the Okinawans were often surprised at "the comparatively humane treatment". Over time, Okinawans would become increasingly despondent with the Americans, but at the time of surrender the American soldiers were less vicious than had been expected.

Post-war

Public fear and Recreation and Amusement Association

In the period after the Emperor of Japan announced that Japan would surrender, many Japanese civilians feared that Allied occupation troops were likely to rape Japanese women when they arrived. These fears were, to a large part, driven by concerns that the Allied troops would exhibit similar behavior to that of Japanese occupation forces in China and the Pacific. The Japanese Government and the governments of several prefectures issued warnings recommending that women take measures to avoid contact with occupation troops, such as staying in their homes and staying with Japanese men. Police in Kanagawa Prefecture, where the Americans were expected to first land, recommended that young women and girls evacuate the area. Several prefectural authorities also suggested that women kill themselves if they were threatened with rape or raped and called for "moral and spiritual education" to enforce this view.

In response, the Japanese government established the Recreation and Amusement Association (RAA), military brothels to cater to the Allied troops upon their arrival, though most professional prostitutes were unwilling to have sex with Americans due to the impact of wartime propaganda. Some of the women who volunteered to work in these brothels claimed that they did so as they felt they had a duty to protect other women from Allied troops. These officially sponsored brothels were ordered closed in January 1946 when the Occupation authorities banned all "public" prostitution while declaring that it was undemocratic and violated the human rights of the women involved. The closure of the brothels took effect a few months later, and it was in private acknowledged that the main reason for closing down the brothels was the huge increase in venereal diseases among the soldiers.

Rapes by U.S. forces

Incidence

Assessments of the incidence of rape by American occupation personnel differ.

John W. Dower has written that while the R.A.A. was in place "the incidence of rape remained relatively low given the huge size of the occupation force". Dower wrote: "According to one calculation, the number of rapes and assaults on Japanese women amounted to around 40 daily while the R.A.A was in operation, and then rose to an average of 330 a day after it was terminated in early 1946". According to Dower, "more than a few incidents" of assault and rape were never reported to the police.

Buruma states that while it is likely that more than 40 rapes took place each day, "most Japanese would have recognized that the Americans were far more disciplined than they had feared, especially in comparison to the behaviour of their own troops abroad".

According to Terèse Svoboda "the number of reported rapes soared" after the closure of the brothels, and she takes this as evidence that the Japanese had been successful in suppressing incidents of rape by providing prostitutes to the soldiers. Svoboda gives one example where R.A.A. facilities were active but some not yet ready to open and "hundreds of American soldiers broke into two of their facilities and raped all the women".

In contrast, Brian Walsh states that while the American occupation forces had a criminal element and many rapes occurred, "there is no credible evidence of the mass rape of Japanese women by American soldiers during the occupation", and claims that this occurred are not supported by the available documentation. Instead, he writes that both Japanese and American records demonstrate that rapes were uncommon, and the incidence was no greater than that in modern American cities. Walsh states that there were 1,100 reported cases of sexual violence by Allied troops throughout the occupation period, though this figure likely understates the actual incidence given that many rapes are never reported. Walsh has noted that the estimates given by Dower and several others would mean that "the U.S. Occupation of Japan would have been one of the worst occurrences of mass sexual violence in the history of the world", something which is not supported by the documentary evidence.

Similarly, Michael S. Molasky, Japanese literature, language and jazz researcher, states in his study of Japanese post-war novels and other pulp literature, that while rape and other violent crime was widespread in naval ports like Yokosuka and Yokohama during the first few weeks of occupation, according to Japanese police reports, the number of incidents declined shortly after and were not common on mainland Japan throughout the rest of occupation.

Incidents

Some historians state that mass rapes took place during the initial phase of the occupation. For instance, Fujime Yuki has stated that 3,500 rapes occurred in the first month after American troops landed. Tanaka relates that in Yokohama, the capital of the prefecture, there were 119 known rapes in September 1945. At least seven academic books and many other works state that there were 1,336 reported rapes during the first 10 days of the occupation of Kanagawa Prefecture. Walsh states that this figure originated from Yuki Tanaka's book Hidden Horrors, and resulted from that author misreading the crime figures in their source. The source states that the Japanese Government recorded 1,326 criminal incidents of all types involving American forces, of which an unspecified number were rapes.

Historians Eiji Takemae and Robert Ricketts state that "When US paratroopers landed in Sapporo, an orgy of looting, sexual violence and drunken brawling ensued. Gang rapes and other sex atrocities were not infrequent" and some of the rape victims committed suicide.

In contrast, Walsh states that while there was a "brief crime wave" during the early phase of the occupation, "there was, relatively speaking, little rape" during this period.

According to Svoboda there are two large events of mass rape recorded by Yuki Tanaka at the time that the R.A.A. brothels were closed down in 1946.
According to Tanaka, close to midnight on April 4, an estimated 50 GIs arriving in 3 trucks assaulted the Nakamura Hospital in Omori district. Attacking at the blow of a whistle, over the period of one hour they raped more than 40 patients and an estimated 37 female staff. One of the raped women had a two-day-old baby that was killed by being thrown on the floor, and also some male patients who tried to protect the women were killed.
According to Tanaka, on April 11, between 30 and 60 U.S. soldiers cut phone lines to a housing block in Nagoya city, and simultaneously raped "many girls and women between the ages of 10 and 55 years".

General Robert L. Eichelberger, the commander of the U.S. Eighth Army, recorded that in the one instance when the Japanese formed a self-help vigilante guard to protect women from off-duty GIs, the Eighth Army ordered armoured vehicles in battle array into the streets and arrested the leaders, and the leaders received long prison terms.

Rapes by British Commonwealth Occupation Force
Australian, British and New Zealand troops in Japan as part of the British Commonwealth Occupation Force (BCOF) also committed rapes. The commander of the BCOF's official reports state that members of the BCOF were convicted of committing 57 rapes in the period May 1946 to December 1947 and a further 23 between January 1948 and September 1951. No official statistics on the incidence of serious crimes during the BCOF's first three months in Japan (February to April 1946) are available. Australian historian Robin Gerster contends that while the official statistics underestimate the level of serious crime among BCOF members, Japanese police often did not pass reports they received on to the BCOF and that the serious crimes which were reported were properly investigated by BCOF military police. The penalties given to members of the BCOF convicted of serious crimes were "not severe", however, and those imposed on Australians were often mitigated or quashed by Australian courts.

According to Takemae and Ricketts:

Allan Clifton, an Australian officer who acted as interpreter and criminal investigator wrote

As to Australian justice Clifton writes regarding another rape that was witnessed by a party of card-players:

Allied censorship of Japanese media
American Occupation authorities imposed wide-ranging censorship on the Japanese media from 10 September 1945 until the end of the occupation in 1952, including bans on covering sensitive social issues and serious crimes committed by members of the Occupation forces.

According to Eiji Takemae and Robert Ricketts, Allied Occupation forces suppressed news of criminal activities such as rape; on September 10, 1945, SCAP "issued press and pre-censorship codes outlawing the publication of all reports and statistics 'inimical to the objectives of the Occupation'".

According to Teresa Svoboda the Japanese press reported cases of rape and looting two weeks into the occupation, to which the Occupation administration responded by "promptly censoring all media". However, Walsh states that the press reported few cases of rapes before the censorship began. For instance, the final article which included any discussion of rapes by Allied forces in the Asahi Shimbun (published on 11 September 1945) stated that none had taken place.

Following the occupation, Japanese magazines published accounts of rapes committed by American servicemen.

See also
 Wartime sexual violence
 Allied war crimes during World War II
 Elizabeth Saunders Home
 Amerasians in Japan
 Rape during the occupation of Germany
 Rape during the liberation of France
 Rape during the Soviet occupation of Poland
 Special Comfort Facility Association
 United States war crimes
 Soviet war crimes

References

Citations

Sources 

 
 
 
 .

Further reading
 
Kramm, Robert (2017): Sanitized Sex. Regulating Prostitution, Venereal Disease, and Intimacy in Occupied Japan, 1945-1952. University of California Press, 
 .

Occupied Japan
United States war crimes
War crimes in Japan
Wartime sexual violence in World War II
Japan–United States relations
United States Armed Forces in Okinawa Prefecture
Rape in Japan
Rape
Wartime sexual violence
British war crimes
British Commonwealth Occupation Force
Violence against women in Asia
History of women in Japan